Haechi is a 2019 South Korean television series starring Jung Il-woo, Go Ara, Kwon Yul, and Park Hoon. Produced by Kim Jong-hak Production, it aired on SBS's Mondays and Tuesdays at 22:00 (KST) from February 11 to April 30, 2019.

Synopsis
Set during the Joseon Dynasty period, the series follows four people from different walks of life who came together to help  Yi Geum, Prince Yeoning (later King Yeongjo)  claim the throne and reform the Saheonbu.

Cast

Main
 Jung Il-woo as Yi Geum, Prince Yeoning (later King Yeongjo)
An intelligent and zealous prince who is discriminated against for his mother's lowly background.
 Go Ara as Chun Yeo-ji
A female police detective of the Saheonbu. One of the best female investigators, she has a talent for both martial arts and foreign languages. Later, she enters the palace as a court maid for Queen Dowager Inwon.
Kwon Yul as Bak Mun-su
A passionate man who seeks justice and aims to protect the weak and the poor. He is preparing for the civil service exam to become a public officer. Later, he becomes an investigator of Saheonbu and a secret investigator for King Yeongjo
Park Hoon as Dal-moon
Portraying himself as a beggar, he controls a network of informants and storytellers who collects informations from all around Joseon's capital and have capabilities in influencing common people's opinion
 Lee Geung-young as Min Jin-won, the late Queen Inhyeon's brother, one of a leader of Noron political faction and one of the most seasoned politician in Joseon court
 Jung Moon-sung as Yi Tan, Prince Milpung, Crown Prince Sohyeon's direct descendant. He believes that the Joseon throne should be owned by descendant of Crown Prince Sohyeon. Using all means necessary, he tries to seize the position of Crown Prince and, subsequently, the throne
  as Chun Yoon-young / Bok-dan. Dreaming to become the Queen of Joseon, she helps Prince Milpung's cause and becomes his partner 
 Han Sang-jin as Wi Byung-joo. An investigator of Saheonbu. Came from a family of Namin (Southerners) political faction, he faces difficulties in his career as investigator, until he aligns himself with Noron political faction and becomes their hands in controlling Saheonbu on their behalf.

Supporting
Han Ji-sang as Do Ji-kwang
Park Ji-yeon as Cho Hong
 as Kyu Hwa-eun
 as Yi Yun, Crown Prince Hwiso (Later King Gyeongjong)
Nam Gi-ae as Queen Inwon
 as Queen Jeongseong / Lady Seo
Jung Sun-won as Joo Young-han
Jung In-seo as Go-mi
Choi Min-chul as Yoon Hyuk
Jeon Bae-soo as Jang Dal
Ahn Seung-gyun as Ah Bong
Im Ho as Yi Kwang-jwa
 as Kae Dol
Ha Sung-kwang as Ja Dong
Seo Eun-yul as Han Joon-jae
 as Kim Chang-jib
Kim Jong-soo as Lee I-myung
Noh Young-hak as Yi Hwon, Prince Yeonryeong
Lee Jae-woo as New Inspector
Lee Pil-mo as Han Jeong Seok
 as Crown Princess Eo (Later Queen Seonui)
Go Joo-won as Yi In-Jwa
Lee Do-yeop as Jo Hyeon-myeong

Special appearance 

 Kim Kap-soo as Yi Sun, King Sukjong

Production
First script reading took place December 2018 at SBS Ilsan Production Studios in Goyang, Gyeonggi Province, South Korea.

On March 7, 2019, it was reported during the filming of the drama Go Ara ruptured her Anterior talofibular ligament which resulted her to be hospitalised and wear a cast.

Original soundtrack

Part 1

Part 2

Ratings
 In this table,  represent the lowest ratings and  represent the highest ratings.
 NR denotes that the drama did not rank in the top 20 daily programs on that date.
 N/A denotes that the rating is not known.

Awards and nominations

Notes

References

External links
  
 
 

Seoul Broadcasting System television dramas
Korean-language television shows
2019 South Korean television series debuts
2019 South Korean television series endings
South Korean historical television series
Television series by Kim Jong-hak Production